Notable events of the late 1990s in webcomics.

Background
As the World Wide Web was proliferating in the second half of the 1990s, various creators of webcomics (a term that was not yet popularized at the time) started to communicate with one another and link to each other's work. Cartoonist Reinder Dijkhuis (Rogues of Clwyd-Rhan) remembered that in mid-1995, there were hundreds of comics made available online; many of which were based on college newspaper comic strips and many were short-lived. From this point on, the World Wide Web gained attention from syndicated cartoonists such as Scott Adams (Dilbert) and cartoonists who saw the internet as a potential path to eventual syndication. Author T Campbell called 1996 the end of the "Stone Age" of webcomics, and cartoonist Shaenon Garrity described the period from 1996 to 2000 as "the Singularity" of webcomics as the medium "exploded" in popularity. Joe Zabel said of Charley Parker's 1995 webcomic Argon Zark! that "the web could hardly have picked a more outstanding premiere series," and celebrated the tenth anniversary of its release with a round table on the "artistic history of webcomics."

In France, interactive digital comics were spread on compact disks during this period, while the introduction of the internet in French homes spurred the creation of the first webcomic blogs. 

In the United States, various major webcomic genres were established and popularized between 1995 and 1999. The video game webcomic came into being in 1995 with the release of Polymer City Chronicles and was popularized in the following years by PvP and Penny Arcade. The first sprite comic – Jay Resop's Neglected Mario Characters – was released in 1998, though the genre wouldn't be popularized until Bob and George came out in 2000. In Reinventing Comics (2000), Scott McCloud pointed out that some webcomic creators had been experimenting with the capabilities of the Web, such as through an interactive hypertext interface, GIF animations, and sound. The first major webcomic portal, Big Panda, started in 1997. Big Panda hosted over 770 webcomics, including Sluggy Freelance and User Friendly. Big Panda's discontinuation eventually resulted in the formation of Keenspot in 2000.

List
Several notable webcomics that started in this period include:

1995

 March 2 – Art Comics Daily by Bebe Williams
 March 13 – Polymer City Chronicles by Chris Morrison (started its print run in 1992)
 June 27 – Argon Zark! by Charley Parker
 September 3 – Kevin and Kell by Bill Holbrook
 Fall – Eric Millikin (titled Fetus-X from 2000 to 2008) by Eric Millikin (formerly with Casey Sorrow)

1996

 January 1 – Bruno by Christopher Baldwin
 March 1 – Magic Inkwell by Cayetano Garza
 March 31 – Help Desk aka Ubersoft by Christopher B. Wright
 June 10 – Red Meat by Max Cannon
 June – Helen, Sweetheart of the Internet by Peter Zale
 September – Sabrina Online by Eric W. Schwartz

1997

 April 1 – Goats by Jonathan Rosenberg
 August 25 – Sluggy Freelance by Pete Abrams
 September 10 – Roomies! by David Willis
 October 27 – Piled Higher and Deeper by Jorge Cham
 November 17 – User Friendly by J.D. "Illiad" Frazer
 Buzzer Beater by Takehiko Inoue
 Leisure Town by Tristan A. Farnon
 You Damn Kid! by Owen Dunne

1998

 January – Ozy and Millie by D. C. Simpson
 February 18 – Pokey the Penguin by Steve Havelka
 March 25 – Jane's World by Paige Braddock
 April 9 – Freefall by Mark Stanley
 May 4 – PvP by Scott Kurtz
 September 21 – Bobbins by John Allison
 October 21 – The PC Weenies by Krishna M. Sadasivam
 November 18 – Penny Arcade by Mike Krahulik and Jerry Holkins
 Astounding Space Thrills by Steve Conley
 Boy on a Stick and Slither by Steven L. Cloud
 Combo Rangers by Fábio Yabu

1999

 January 1 – College Roomies from Hell!!! by Maritza Campos-Rebolledo
 March 1 – Superosity by Chris Crosby
 June 14 – Elf Life by Carson Fire (under the pseudonym Eric Gustafson)
 June 21 – Sheldon by Dave Kellett
 August – Triangle and Robert by Patrick Shaughnessy
 November 15 – Real Life by Maelyn Dean
 December 25 – It's Walky! by David Willis
 Cat and Girl by Dorothy Gambrell

References

1990s webcomics
Webcomics by year